El Max (al-Maks) is a neighborhood in Alexandria, Egypt.

It is the possible location of the ancient Christian monastic complex of the Pempton at the fifth milestone west of Alexandria.

See also 
 Neighborhoods in Alexandria

References

Populated places in Alexandria Governorate
Neighbourhoods of Alexandria